Toni Basil is the second and most recent studio album by Toni Basil, released in December 1983 on Chrysalis Records. Despite the success of her previous album Word of Mouth and the single "Mickey", the album was less successful and did not enter the Billboard album chart. The first single from the album, "Over My Head", reached #81 on the Billboard Hot 100, her third and final song to do so. Of the four singles from the album, three appeared on various charts in the US.

Singles
The album spawned four singles, three of which charted. The album's first single, "Street Beat", failed to enter the Hot 100 but managed to reach number 63 on Billboards Hot Dance Club Songs chart.  The next single, "Over My Head", reached number 81 on the Billboard Hot 100, spending a total of six weeks on the chart.  The third single, "Suspense", reached number 42 on Billboards Hot Dance Club Songs chart, spending a total of 11 weeks on the chart. The final single, "Do You Wanna Dance", failed to chart.

Track listing

International edition
Adapted from Discogs.

Side A:
"Over My Head" – 3:20
"Do You Wanna Dance" – 3:58
"Go for the Burn" – 4:04
"Street Beat" – 3:37
"Suspense" – 3:54
Side B:
"Spacewalkin' the Dog" – 4:23
"Best Performance" – 3:50
"Easy for You to Say" – 4:26
"I Don't Hear You" – 3:32

US edition
Side A:
"Over My Head" (Franne Golde, Sue Shifrin) – 3:20
"I Don't Hear You" (Greg Mathieson, Trevor Veitch, Toni Basil) – 3:32 
"Easy for You to Say" (Dennis Lambert, Peter Beckett) – 4:26
"Suspense" (Alan Roy Scott, Brian Short) – 3:54
"Go for the Burn" (Allee Willis, Richie Zito, Toni Basil) – 4:04
Side B:
"Spacewalkin' the Dog" (Franne Golde, Richard Wolfe) – 4:23
"Street Beat" (Allee Willis, Bruce Roberts, Toni Basil) – 3:37
"Do You Wanna Dance" (Barry Blue) – 3:58
"Best Performance" (Allee Willis, Bruce Roberts, Toni Basil) – 3:50

Personnel
Toni Basil – vocals
Richie Zito – guitar, Linn and Simmons drums
Arthur Barrow – bass guitar, keyboards
Carlos Vega – drums
Sylvester Levay - additional keyboards on "Over My Head" and "Do You Wanna Dance"
The Locke High School Cadence Band - cadence drums on "Street Beat"
Allee Willis, Beth Andersen, Bruce Roberts, Charlotte Crossley, Cindy Fee, Darrell Phinnessee, Jimmy Haas, Joe Esposito, Joe Pizzulo, Julia Tillman Waters, Lauren Wood, Mary Hylan, Maxine Waters – backing vocals
Technical
Brian Reeves, Bob Casale - engineer
Richard Seireeni - art direction
Jerry Casale – cover concept
Allan Ballard - photography
Giorgio Moroder, Jeff Aldrich – "very special thanks"

References

1983 albums
Toni Basil albums
Albums produced by Mike Chapman
Albums produced by Richie Zito
Chrysalis Records albums
Virgin Records albums